Arto Kalevi Härkönen (born 31 January 1959, in Helsinki) is a retired Finnish javelin thrower. He won the gold medal at the 1984 Summer Olympics, with a throw of 86.76 metres.

International competitions

References

1959 births
Living people
Athletes from Helsinki
Finnish male javelin throwers
Finnish evangelists
Olympic athletes of Finland
Olympic gold medalists for Finland
Athletes (track and field) at the 1984 Summer Olympics
Medalists at the 1984 Summer Olympics
Olympic gold medalists in athletics (track and field)
Universiade medalists in athletics (track and field)
Universiade silver medalists for Finland
Medalists at the 1979 Summer Universiade